BBH 75 is the fourth album by French rock singer Jacques Higelin, released in 1974 on the Pathé Marconi label. It is a radical departure from his previous works with the Saravah label, as it is entirely a rock album. The album would bring Higelin commercial success and critical recognition from French rock circles, and the album is considered influential on the future of French rock.

History
The title of the album is the initials of the three musicians from the album: Charles Bennaroch, Simon Boissezon and Jacques Higelin. The album was initially titled BBH 74, but as it was released near the end of 1974, it was finally retitled BBH 75. A rare promotional vinyl released back then bore the original title.

Critical reception
The French edition of Rolling Stone magazine named it the 5th greatest French rock album. It's also included in the book Philippe Manœuvre présente : Rock français, de Johnny à BB Brunes, 123 albums essentiels. It is certified gold record for 100,000 albums sold.

Track listing

Personnel

Musicians
 Charles Bennaroch - drums, percussions, harmonica.
 Simon Boissezon - bass guitar, guitars.
 Jacques Higelin - vocals.

Production
 Jacques Higelin - producer.
 Roger Ducourtieux - recording.
 Claude Dejacques - artistic direction.
 Patrice Duchemin, Yves Van Waerbeke - photographs.
 Norman Mongan - design.

Certifications

References 

1974 albums
Jacques Higelin albums